Fabio Roselli may refer to:

 Fabio Roselli (footballer) (born 1983), Italian footballer
 Fabio Roselli (rugby union) (born 1971), Italian rugby union coach and former player